Kurtis Morrin (born 17 March 2000) is an Australian professional rugby league player who plays as a  for the Canterbury-Bankstown Bulldogs in the NRL (National Rugby League).

Background
He is the nephew of former Canterbury player Brad Morrin.

Playing career
Morrin made his first grade debut from the bench in his side's 36–12 victory over the Wests Tigers at Western Sydney Stadium in round 15 of the 2022 season. Morrin also scored a try on debut.
On 25 September, Morrin played for Canterbury's NSW Cup team in their grand final loss to Penrith.

References

External links
Canterbury Bulldogs profile

2000 births
Living people
Australian rugby league players
Canterbury-Bankstown Bulldogs players
Rugby league locks
Rugby league players from Sydney